Tun Tun Min (born 4 October 1992) is a Burmese Lethwei fighter and former Openweight Lethwei World Champion of Mon descent. He is the youngest fighter to ever win the Lethwei Golden Belt, obtaining the title at age 21, and is notable for fighting foreign challengers from outside Myanmar.

Early life 
Tun Tun Min was born in a remote village of Mon state and is an ethnic Mon and Muslim.  The Mon are an ethnic group related to the Khmer people of Cambodia.  The Mon along with other Mon-Khmer groups inhabited Indochina long before the Burmese and Tai people migrated to Indochina. He is the second eldest son of Lethwei fighter U Tun Tun Zaw and his wife Daw Aye Win. Tun Tun Min was introduced to the world of traditional boxing through his grandfather and father, both well-known former boxers in the Mon state. At the age of 6 he started training with sandbags and rudimentary equipment that his father had bought him. By 4th grade, at the age of 9, he won his first fight at the local elementary school against a rival classmate he didn't get along with. They were amateur Lethwei fights fought on the sand and not yet in a ring.

In 6th grade Tun Tun Min decided to drop out of school to focus exclusively on his boxing career in order to support his family. For a short period of time, from 2007 until 2009, he also worked at a pineapple plantation in Thailand to earn more income. His boss at the time dared him to fight some Muay Thai boys in the village. Although he did beat them, his boss unfortunately denied him to further pursue this venture. Upon his return home, Tun Tun Min joined the Mudontha Lethwei Club, founded in 2008 by Saya U Ye Thway, U Thamain Thawdar and Tun Tun Min's father.

Career

Lethwei 
Under the guidance of his new teachers, Tun Tun Min started his professional career fighting for prize money in Lethwei fights in pagodas and other religious festivals. He quickly became a rising star because of his aggressive style and more opportunities came around. He faced another rising star in Too Too to a draw. Three days after, Tun Tun Min was offered a fight for 6 Lakh or 600 000 Burmese kyats against Soe Lin Oo, a 2010 Golden Belt champion and already an established name at the time. Because his father insisted, the match was signed and ultimately fought to a draw. At the time, Tun Tun Min described Soe Lin Oo as the toughest opponent he had ever faced. Quickly rising through the ranks, from that moment on his career would see many more celebrated victories. Tun Tun Min faced many fighters from neighbouring Thailand and due to his larger size, he faced many foreign opponents. eventually leading up to his shot at becoming the champion.

Despite being both among the top ranked lethwei fighters in Myanmar currently, and fans and promoters eager to make the fight happen, Tun Tun Min and Too Too have refused to fight each other due to their long-lasting friendship.

He took part in Muay Thai competitions at the 2012 Asian Muay Championships, 2013 Southeast Asian Games and 2013 Asian Indoor and Martial Arts Games.

Over the course of his career Tun Tun Min has been discriminated against because of his Muslim background. Fans often let their voice be heard during his matches with foreign competition, shouting racist remarks and outing their discriminating opinion in interviews. In 2017 a calendar listing current and former champions in various categories, omitted Tun Tun Min's name, title and likeness in the champions category. This prompted media to accuse the Myanmar Traditional Boxing Federation, who had commissioned the calendar, of discrimination. Tun Tun Min admitted considering leaving the sport, but the fact that he might be able to win his open-weight title back changed his mind.

On March 31, 2019, Tun Tun Min faced Muaythai Champion Thaneelek Lookkromluang form Thailand and won by KO.

Becoming champion
On September 21, 2014, Tun Tun Min became Openweight Lethwei World champion by defeating Saw Nga Man, a friend with whom he trained together for the SEA Games and someone he has looked up to for the majority of his professional career. At the age of 21, Tun Tun Min became the youngest fighter in history to win a Lethwei Golden belt. At that time 33 year old Saw Nga Man, nicknamed Saw Shark, had been a dominant openweight champion for five years and people started to question his durability while continually facing up-and-coming younger fighters. These doubts where answered on that fateful evening when Myanmar crowned its latest champion.

Cyrus Washington trilogy 
Cyrus Washington had his introduction to Lethwei back in 2010 when he faced Saw Nga Man, who was the champion at the time, long before Tun Tun Min's name would even start to appear in newspapers. Because Cyrus was already an accomplished Muay Thai fighter it took 4 years before Tun Tun Min was eligible to fight him. The opportunity presented itself a few months before their first fight where Tun Tun Min had beaten Saw Nga Man for the open-weight title.

Their first meeting was on December 7, 2014 at the inaugural Air KBZ sponsored Aung Lan Championship, currently an event where winners in each weight-class receive a belt and a triangular champions flag. In a stunning upset Cyrus knocked out Tun Tun Min in round three in spectacular fashion. Even after using his time-out Tun Tun Min could no longer continue. Because the bout was considered an exhibition match the open-weight title was not at stake, nor would it be during any of their fights.

The rematch took place 4 months later on April 11, 2015 at Thuwunna National Indoor Stadium in Yangon. Cyrus was once again able to knock out Tun Tun Min with a spinning technique. Unlike in their first fight Tun Tun Min was able to recover during his timeout and eventually knock Cyrus down in the 5th round prompting the corner to throw in the towel. Cyrus later explained that there was some confusion about the rules. He tried to call for a timeout, but according to the official rules you cannot use one in the last round. The confusion and miscommunication resulted in the towel being thrown.

On December 20, 2015, Tun Tun Min faced Cyrus Washington at the second Air KBZ Aung Lan Championship, for their third and final fight. The fight ended quickly and Tun Tun Min struck Cyrus on the eye socket. After taking his timeout Cyrus made clear that he did not want to continue, and the match was stopped declaring Tun Tun Min the victor after just 71 seconds. After the fight many fans were displeased with how the fight concluded and threw bottles and other items into the ring.

Lethwei in Japan 
Tun Tun Min participated at the first Lethwei organized by the ILFJ. He faced Australian Adem Yilmaz at Lethwei Grand Prix Japan 2016 and knockout him out at the end of the 5th round.

Losing the title 
In 2016, Tun Tun Min was challenged Canadian born fighter Dave Leduc and because of Leduc's dominant performance over Too Too, Tun Tun Min accepted the challenge. In their first match, Tun Tun Min started strong and dominated the early rounds, but Leduc came back in later rounds, resulting in the exciting match ending in a draw. After the match, Tun Tun Min was quoted saying that he had difficulties with Dave's to control the distance, but that he was confident and able to put on a better performance when they would rematch.

On December 11, 2016, the much anticipated rematch of Tun Tun Min and Dave Leduc took place at the 3rd Air KBZ Aung Lan Golden Belt Championship in Yangon, Myanmar. The two previously fought in October to a draw. Confident in his ability, Tun Tun Min accepted to put his openweight world title on the line. Throughout the match, Leduc targeted the leg of Tun Tun Min with push kicks and in round three, Leduc caught Tun Tun Min's left high-kick, causing him to go off-balance and twist his knee on impact. Tun Tun Min was forced to take the time-out. Continuation of round three saw Leduc execute another throw, Tun Tun Min eventually forfeited and lost for only the second time in his professional career.

World Lethwei Championship 
In 2017, Tun Tun Min signed an multi-fight contract with World Lethwei Championship. For his promotional debut WLC 1: The Great Beginning, he faced British Muaythai champion Nicholas Carter. Tun Tun Min put an end to the fight in the first round by knocking down Carter with vicious headbutts and punches, reaching the maximum knockdowns.

Surgery 
On December 11, 2016, Tun Tun Min sustained an injury to his knee in the fight with Dave Leduc and instead of opting for surgery right away, he fought in WLC 1. Following the fight, he took three months off to rest. In that time he felt depressed and was not sure if he would be able to fight again because of the injury. On April 7, 2017, after some encouraging words from his father he traveled to Thailand, to get surgery on his right meniscus and the ligament. He was operated at Phyathai Nawamin International Hospital in Bangkok. After successful surgery Tun Tun Min stayed for a brief recuperation until flying back home on April 18. Rehabilitation was estimated to take 8 months.

In November 2017, Tun Tun Min made a public statement that his knee was recovered and that with sufficient training he would be returning to the ring in January the same year. An announcement was made that would be fighting Thiago Goularte from Brazil on January 14, but the fight and the event was canceled since his knee was still bothering him. In the meantime, Tun Tun Min started coaching and training at Fit & Fight Fitness & Lethwei, a newly opened facility in Yangon that partly carries his name.

Return to the ring 
On July 22, 2018, after 16 months of recovery and training Tun Tun Min's next opponent would be Thai Fight star Saiyok Pumpanmuang who was no stranger to glove-less combat. In 2013, Pumpanmuang was the headliner in the Thai Fight the reality television show called Thai Fight Kard Chuek and regularly fights for the promotion. Tun Tun Min and Pumpanmuang had previously met in 2013 as they both participated in the TV show.

In their fight, held in Yangon during the Golden Belt Championship, both showed immense heart. Fans they did not get to see many of Tun Tun Min's powerful trademark kicks. After the fight, Tun Tun Min mentioned that Saiyok was a more dangerous opponent than Leduc and indicated he wanted the rematch by the end of the year. Tun Tun Min has also said that this final challenge versus Leduc is what kept him going through both rehabilitation and the difficult relationship with spectators who do not support him as a Muslim. It is why in August 2018, Tun Tun Min wasted no time and issued an official challenge the reigning openweight champion Dave Leduc for a third time. However, there would be one more hurdle to overcome. In a last minute change, Daryl Lokuku who was set to face Dave Leduc initially, was instead scheduled to face Tun Tun Min on August 19 at the third Myanmar Lethwei World Championship in Yangon. Even though Tun Tun Min was able to knock down Daryl with a headbutt near the very end of an intense 5-round fight, ending in a draw. With three months of training ahead, everything would now be set for Tun Tun Min to face Dave Leduc at the Air KBZ Grand Final Myanmar Championship in Yangon.

Dave Leduc trilogy 
On December 16, 2018, in a sold out Thein Pyu Stadium, fans saw Tun Tun Min fighting out of the blue corner and Dave Leduc fighting out of the red corner, the first time a foreigner has been able to do so as it is customary to have Myanmar born fighter and foreign challengers come out of the opposite corner. Tun Tun Min weighed in at 79.5kg and Leduc at 79.65kg. A fully recovered Tun Tun Min once again had tremendous difficulty with the distance control of Leduc. Early in the first round, Leduc was able to force a count on him with a headbutt knockdown. At 1:43 Leduc landed a powerful elbow that knocked out Tun Tun Min and incapacitated him for over 40 seconds, his team called the injury time-out. 

The fight resumed with Tun Tun Min visibly frustrated of not being able to land on Leduc, led him to attempt a flying roundhouse kick and other acrobatic feats in an attempt to slow down his rival. The latter rounds saw both boxers vying for a finish, but ended without another knockout at the final bell and Leduc retained his title.

Personal life
In his time off Tun Tun Min enjoys Sepak takraw, volleyball and amateur football. When he was young he selected for the Kyaikmaraw Township Football Team. When he is not playing sports he likes listening to music and watching films. As of 2015, Tun Tun Min and his wife Farana reside in Yangon.

Championships and accomplishments

Championships 
Lethwei World Champion
 Openweight Lethwei Golden Belt
 Eighteen successful title defenses
 Myanmar Lethwei World Championship
 MLWC Openweight World Championship (Three times)
 Other championships
  2015 Thingyan Fight Champion
  2013 Dagon Shwe Aung Lan Special Award
  2010 Regions and States Lethwei Competition
  2013 Southeast Asian Games - Naypyidaw, Myanmar
  2013 Asian Indoor Martial Arts Games  - Incheon, South Korea
  2012 Asian Muay Championships - Ho Chi Minh City, Vietnam

Awards, records, and honours 
Youngest Golden Belt champion
2015 Best fighter award

Lethwei record 

|- style="background:#fbb;"
| 2023-01-29 || Loss || align="left" | Thway Thit Win Hlaing || The Great Lethwei #3 || Yangon, Myanmar || Decision || 5 || 3:00
|- style="background:#cfc;" |-
| 2022-08-14 || Win || align="left" | Hamed Soleimani || 2022 Myanmar Lethwei World Championship || Yangon, Myanmar || KO || 1 ||
|-
! style=background:white colspan=9 |
|- style="background:#c5d2ea;" |-
| 2020-12-06 || Draw || align="left" | Shwe Yar Man || 2020 Myanmar Lethwei World Championship || Yangon, Myanmar|| Draw || 5 ||
|- style="background:#c5d2ea;" |-
| 2020-01-20 || Draw || align="left" | Keivan Soleimani || Win Sein Taw Ya 2020 || Mudon Township, Myanmar|| Draw || 5 ||
|- style="background:#cfc;"
| 2019-08-18 || Win || align="left" | Mikhail Vetrila|| 2019 Myanmar Lethwei World Championship||Yangon, Myanmar || KO || 5 || 1:51
|-
! style=background:white colspan=9 |
|- style="background:#cfc;"
| 2019-03-31 || Win || align="left" | Thaneelek Lookkromluang || Lethwei Nation Fight || Yangon, Myanmar || KO || 4 ||
|- style="background:#c5d2ea;" |-
| 2018-12-16 || Draw || align="left" | Dave Leduc || 2018 Air KBZ Grand Final Myanmar Championship || Yangon, Myanmar|| Draw || 5 ||
|-
! style=background:white colspan=9 |
|- style="background:#c5d2ea;" |-
| 2018-08-19 || Draw || align="left" | Daryl Lokuku || 2018 Myanmar Lethwei World Championship || Yangon, Myanmar|| Draw || 5 ||
|- style="background:#c5d2ea;"
| 2018-07-22 || Draw || align="left" | Saiyok Pumpanmuang || 2018 Golden Belt Championship|| Yangon, Myanmar || Draw || 5 ||
|-  style="background:#cfc;"
| 2017-03-03 || Win ||align=left| Nicholas Carter || WLC 1: The Great Beginning || Yangon, Myanmar || TKO || 1 || 2:59
|-  style="background:#fbb;"
| 2016-12-11 || Loss ||align=left| Dave Leduc || 2016 Air KBZ Aung Lan Championship || Yangon, Myanmar || TKO (Forfeit) || 3 || 2:34
|-
! style=background:white colspan=9 |
|-  style="background:#cfc;"
| 2016-10-27 || Win ||align=left| Adem Yilmaz || Lethwei Grand Prix Japan 2016 ||Tokyo, Japan || KO || 5 || 
|- style="background:#c5d2ea;"
| 2016-10-09 || Draw || align="left" | Dave Leduc || GTG International Challenge Fights 2016 || Yangon, Myanmar || Draw || 5 ||
|-  style="background:#cfc;"
| 2016-08-21 || Win ||align=left| Petchchuechip (Tanee Khomgrich) || 2016 Myanmar Lethwei World Championship || Yangon, Myanmar || KO || 1 || 
|-
! style=background:white colspan=9 |
|-  style="background:#cfc;"
| 2016-04-02 || Win ||align=left| Ludwik Dokhoyan || Max Thingyan Fight || Yangon, Myanmar || KO || 1 || 
|-  style="background:#cfc;"
| 2016-02-23 || Win ||align=left| Evgeni Klimin || Thaung Pyin Challenge Fights || Ye Township, Myanmar || KO || 2 || 
|-  style="background:#cfc;"
| 2016-02-04 || Win ||align=left| Tolipov Mansurbek || Win Sein Taw Ya 2016 || Mudon Township, Myanmar || KO || 2 || 
|-  style="background:#cfc;"
| 2016-01-17 || Win ||align=left| Saw Gaw Mu Do|| Challenge to Myanmar Champion! || Yangon, Myanmar || KO || 2 || 
|-  style="background:#cfc;"
| 2015-12-20 || Win ||align=left| Cyrus Washington || 2015 Air KBZ Aung Lan Championship || Yangon, Myanmar || KO || 1 || 
|-  style="background:#cfc;"
| 2015-10-11 || Win ||align=left| Daniel Kerr|| Who is the BEST? || Yangon, Myanmar || KO || 2 || 
|-  style="background:#cfc;"
| 2015-08-30 || Win ||align=left| Jackson Alves de Souza || All Star Big Fight || Yangon, Myanmar || KO || 1 || 
|-  style="background:#cfc;"
| 2015-04-11 || Win ||align=left| Cyrus Washington || Thingyan Fight 2015 || Yangon, Myanmar || KO || 5 || 
|-  style="background:#cfc;"
| 2015-03-29 || Win ||align=left| Petchmankong Gaiyanghadaow || One On One Myanmar-Thai Challenge Fights || Yangon, Myanmar || KO || 3 || 
|-  style="background:#cfc;"
| 2015-03-04 || Win ||align=left| Dernchonlek Sor.Sor.Niyom || Kyaik Kay Lar Tha Challenge Fights || Lamaing Township, Myanmar || KO || 4 || 
|- style="background:#c5d2ea;" |-
| 2015-02-04 || Draw || align="left" | Berneung Topkingboxing || 68th Mon National Day || Ye Township, Myanmar || Draw || 5 ||
|-  style="background:#cfc;"
| 2015-01-15 || Win ||align=left| Dimitri Masson || Win Sein Taw Ya 2015 || Mudon Township, Myanmar || KO || 2 || 
|-  style="background:#cfc;"
| 2015-01-05 || Win ||align=left| Trakoonsing Tor.Jatuten || Hnit Kayin Challenge Fights || Ye Township, Myanmar || KO || 4 || 
|-  style="background:#fbb;"
| 2014-12-07 || Loss ||align=left| Cyrus Washington || 2014 Air KBZ Aung Lan Championship || Yangon, Myanmar || KO || 3 ||
|-
! style=background:white colspan=9 |
|-  style="background:#cfc;"
| 2014-11-02 || Win ||align=left| Matthew Richardson || One on One International Challenge Fight || Yangon, Myanmar || KO || 3 || 
|-  style="background:#cfc;"
| 2014-09-21 || Win ||align=left| Saw Nga Man || Who is Number One? || Yangon, Myanmar || TKO || 4 || 
|-
! style=background:white colspan=9 |
|-  style="background:#cfc;"
| 2014-08-31 || Win ||align=left| Petchtae Tor.Maxmuaythai || Ultimate International Letwhay Challenge Fight 2014 || Singapore || KO || 2 || 
|-  style="background:#cfc;"
| 2014-07-06 || Win ||align=left| Weerapol || One on One Big Fight || Yangon, Myanmar || KO || 3 || 
|-  style="background:#cfc;"
| 2014-05-18 || Win ||align=left| Petchtae Tor.Maxmuaythai || International Lethwei Challenge Fights || Yangon, Myanmar || KO || 5 || 
|- style="background:#c5d2ea;" |-
| 2014-04-06 || Draw || align="left" | Saw Yan Paing || Myaw Sin Island Challenge Fights || Yangon, Myanmar || Draw || 5 ||
|-  style="background:#cfc;"
| 2014-03-26 || Win ||align=left| Pravit Aor.Piriyapinyo || Taung Pa Village Challenge Fights || Mudon Township, Myanmar || KO || 2 || 
|- style="background:#c5d2ea;" |-
| 2014-03-15 || Draw || align="left" | Pravit Aor.Piriyapinyo || International Challenge Fights || Lamaing, Ye, Myanmar || Draw || 5 ||
|-  style="background:#cfc;"
| 2014-03-09 || Win ||align=left| Rajchasie Pumphanmuang || Hla Ka Zaing Village International Challenge Fights || Kyaikmaraw Township, Myanmar || KO || 3 || 
|-  style="background:#cfc;"
| 2014-01-26 || Win ||align=left| Yodkunkrai Por.Wiriya || International Lethwei Challenge Fights || Thaung Pyin, Myanmar || KO || 1 || 
|- style="background:#c5d2ea;" |-
| 2013-09-21 || Draw || align="left" | Naoki Samukawa || Myanmar vs. Japan Challenge Fight || Yangon, Myanmar || Draw || 5 ||
|- style="background:#c5d2ea;" |-
| 2013-05-12 || Draw || align="left" | Soe Lin Oo || Lethwei Challenge Fights || Yangon, Myanmar || Draw || 5 ||
|- style="background:#c5d2ea;" |-
| 2013-04-25 || Draw || align="left" | Soe Lin Oo || Lethwei Challenge Fights || Myanmar || Draw || 5 ||
|-  style="background:#cfc;"
| 2013 || Win ||align=left| Yodkunkrai Por.Wiriya || International Lethwei Challenge Fights || Myanmar || KO || 1 || 
|-  style="background:#cfc;"
| 2013-05 || Win ||align=left| Saw Yan Paing || Lethwei Challenge Fights || Lamaing, Ye, Myanmar || KO || 2 || 
|-  style="background:#cfc;"
| 2013-03-25 || Win ||align=left| Tun Tun || Lethwei Challenge Fights || Ye Township, Myanmar || KO || 3 || 
|- style="background:#c5d2ea;" |-
| 2013-02-12 || Draw || align="left" | Dawna Aung|| Taungoo City Challenge Fights || Taungoo, Myanmar || Draw || 5 ||
|-  style="background:#cfc;"
| 2013-02-05 || Win ||align=left| Yodtang || Win Sein Taw Ya 2013 || Mudon Township, Myanmar || KO || 1 || 
|-  style="background:#cfc;"
| 2013-01-20 || Win ||align=left| Poonpetch || Myanmar vs. Thailand Letwhay Competition || Yangon, Myanmar || KO || 1 || 
|-  style="background:#cfc;"
| 2013-01-06 || Win ||align=left| Felix || Dagon Shwe Aung Lan 2013 || Yangon, Myanmar || KO || 2 || 
|-  style="background:#cfc;"
| 2012-12-14 || Win ||align=left| Saw Ga Pa Rae Hmu || Lethwei Challenge Fights || Mandalay, Myanmar || KO || 3 || 
|- style="background:#c5d2ea;" |-
| 2012-11-25 || Draw || align="left" | Tha Pyay Nyo || Lethwei Challenge Fights || Yangon, Myanmar || Draw || 5 ||
|- style="background:#c5d2ea;" |-
| 2012 || Draw || align="left" | Tha Pyay Nyo || Lethwei Challenge Fights || Lamaing, Ye, Myanmar || Draw || 5 ||
|-  style="background:#c5d2ea;"
| 2012-02 || Draw ||align=left| Win Tin || Thaung Pyin Challenge Fights || Ye Township, Myanmar || Draw || 5 || 
|-  style="background:#c5d2ea;"
| 2012 || Draw ||align=left| Daung Thi Chay || Win Sein Taw Ya 2012 || Mudon Township, Myanmar || Draw || 5 || 
|-  style="background:#cfc;"
| 2011-11 || Win ||align=left| Sankom Muang Ya-mo (Pettaporn) || Pa Nga International Lethwei Challenge Fights || Thanbyuzayat Township, Myanmar || KO || 3 ||
|-  style="background:#fbb;"
| 2011-11-07 || Loss ||align=left| Nay Salai (Maw She) || (56th) Kayin State Day Aung Lan Semi final || Myanmar || TKO (cut) || 3 ||
|-  style="background:#cfc;"
| 2011-07-03 || Win ||align=left| Shwe Thein Aung || Myanmar vs. Thailand Challenge Fights (Day 2) || Mandalay, Myanmar || KO || 1 || 
|-  style="background:#c5d2ea;"
| 2011-05-16 || Draw ||align=left| Soe Htet Oo || Commemoration of Nyaung Water Festival || Mudon Township, Myanmar || Draw || 5 || 
|-  style="background:#cfc;"
| 2011-03-15 || Win ||align=left| Saw Gaw Mu Do || Thanbyuzayat Challenge Fights || Thanbyuzayat Township, Myanmar || KO || 2 || 
|- style="background:#c5d2ea;" |-
| 2011 || Draw || align="left" | Soe Lin Oo || Lethwei Challenge Fights || Myanmar || Draw || 5 ||
|- style="background:#c5d2ea;" |-
| 2011 || Draw || align="left" | Too Too || Lethwei Challenge Fights || Myanmar || Draw || 5 ||
|- style="background:#c5d2ea;" |-
| 2011 || Draw || align="left" | Kyaw Ye Khaung || Royal Club Challenge Fights || Mawlamyine, Myanmar || Draw || 4 ||
|- style="background:#c5d2ea;" |-
| 2010-10-26 || Draw || align="left" | Kyar Pauk || Yele Pagoda Lethwei Challenge Fights || Kyaikkhami, Myanmar || Draw || 4 ||
|-
| colspan=9 | Legend:

Muay Thai record

|-  style="background:#fbb;"
| 2013-07-14 || Loss||align=left| Youssef Boughanem || Thai Fight Kard Chuek || Bangkok, Thailand || Decision || 3 || 3:00
|-  style="background:#cfc;"
| 2013-06-15 || Win ||align=left|  Dimitri Masson || Thai Fight Kard Chuek || Bangkok, Thailand || Decision || 3 || 3:00
|-  style="background:#cfc;"
| 2013-06-01 || Win ||align=left|  Amadou Ba|| Thai Fight Kard Chuek || Bangkok, Thailand || TKO || 1 || 1:25
|-
| colspan=9 | Legend:

Ganryujima record
On July 31, 2016, Tun Tun Min competed in a hybrid MMA tournament titled Ganryujima as a representative of Lethwei. The tournament was held at the Ariake Coliseum in Tokyo, Japan. His opponent was Daryl Lokoku, who represented kickboxing. In his lone Ganryujima fight, Tun Tun Min lost by first-round technical knockout. 
   

|-
|Loss
|align=center| 0–1
|Daryl Lokoku
|TKO (punches)
|Ganryujima 4 - Tokyo
| 
|align=center|1
|align=center|2:03
|Tokyo, Japan
|
|-

References

External links

 

Living people
1992 births
Burmese Lethwei practitioners
People from Mon State
Southeast Asian Games gold medalists for Myanmar
Competitors at the 2013 Southeast Asian Games
Burmese Muslims